Bruno López Rodríguez (born 6 September 1971) is a Spanish rower. He competed in the men's quadruple sculls event at the 1992 Summer Olympics.

References

1971 births
Living people
Spanish male rowers
Olympic rowers of Spain
Rowers at the 1992 Summer Olympics
Sportspeople from Asturias